Polevskoy is a town in Sverdlovsk Oblast, Russia, located  southwest of Yekaterinburg, the administrative center of the oblast. Population:    60,000 (1974); 25,000 (1939).

History
The town is best known for its Dumnaya Mountain, where a monument to those who died fighting Kolchak's army is located. The mountain and its surroundings are also mentioned in many tales by Pavel Bazhov.

The town was founded in the first quarter of the 18th century as a settlement around copper mines. The first mine was established in 1702 and the commercial development started in 1718. In 1724–1727, the Polevskoy Copper Smelting Plant was built to process the copper.

The modern town comprises the territories of former settlements of Gumeshki, Polevskoy, and Seversky.

Flag
The flag of Polevskoy consists of the Venus symbol (♀), which represents the chemical element copper, the character Lizard Queen of Russian folklore, the symbolic representation of the Stone Flower from the story of the same name, and the eight-pointed star, the brand of the Seversky Pipe Plant.

Administrative and municipal status
Within the framework of the administrative divisions, it is, together with thirteen rural localities, incorporated as the Town of Polevskoy—an administrative unit with the status equal to that of the districts. As a municipal division, the Town of Polevskoy is incorporated as Polevskoy Urban Okrug.

Sports
The bandy team Seversky Trubnik plays in a recreational league.

References

Notes

Sources

Cities and towns in Sverdlovsk Oblast
Yekaterinburgsky Uyezd